The town of Dongji is an administrative division of Putuo District, Zhoushan, Zhejiang province, China. The town, as an administrative unit, occupies several minor islands of the Zhoushan Archipelago, namely:
 the islands of the Zhongjieshan Archipelago, the three largest of which, west to east, are Huangxing Island, Miaozihu Island, and Qingbang Island.
 Dongfushan Island a few miles to the southeast of them.
 A few tiny islets farther east, at the easternmost extremity of the archipelago.

Most of the town's population resides on the larger islands of the Zhongjieshan Archipelago. The actual urban area, i.e. the "town" as marked on most maps, is in Miaozihu Island.

Lisbon Maru was sunk near these islands on October 1, 1942.

References

External links
Government website (Simplified Chinese)

Township-level divisions of Zhejiang
Zhoushan